Ganta United Methodist Hospital is a hospital in Ganta, northeast Liberia. The hospital serves a population of around 450,000 in Liberia and neighbouring countries.

History 
The hospital was established in 1926 by Dr. George Way Harley and his wife Winifred. It had to close after severe damage by looting and a rocket attack during the summer of 2003, but reopened in March 2004.

Capabilities 
In 2005, the hospital had two physicians, an ophthalmologist, and a general practitioner who also carried out surgery. Services provided by the hospital included an outpatient clinic, obstetrics, pediatrics, and laboratory services. It also rans an Eye Project with a jeep-equipped outreach team to bring patients for operations such as cataract removal.

The hospital is part of a complex which includes a leprosy and tuberculosis rehabilitation centre, schools and vocational training facilities, and a demonstration farm.

See also 
 List of hospitals in Liberia

References
 United Methodist Church article
 

Hospital buildings completed in 1926
Hospitals in Liberia
Hospitals established in 1926
Nimba County
1926 establishments in Liberia